Degeto Weltspiegel were short Nazi propaganda/news films that played in German cinemas from 1939–1943. There were a total of 50 reels. They were produced by Tobis Film on 35 mm film by special units within the German Army. The following list is not complete. Below are other specials within a certain theme.

 Spanien und der 50. Geburtstag des Führers
 Der Stählerne Pakt wird unterzeichnet
 Danzig, Italien und Japan
 Der Westwall
 Danzig ist wieder deutsch
 Führerhauptquartier
 Warschau kapituliert
 Deutsche Schiffe kontrollieren die See
 Dänemark und Norwegen unter Deutschem Schutz
 Vormarsch in Norwegen
 Im Morgengrauen des 10. Mai 1940
 Vorwärts durch Belgien
 Aus der deutschen Seekriegsführung
 Marz durch Belgien
 Die Schlacht um Dunkirchen
 Rheinübergang und Eroberung der Marginot Linie
 Die Schlacht von Frankreich
 Der Einzug in Paris
 Zweimal Waffenstillstand
 Entscheidung auf dem Balkan I. Englands Balkanplane
 Entscheidung auf dem Balkan II. Jugoslawiens Ende
 Entscheidung auf dem Balkan III. Der Sprung nach Kreta
 Europas Kampf gegen den Bolschewismus I, (Kein titel)
 Europas Kampf gegen den Bolschewismus II, Ein Erdteil marschiert
 Europas Kampf gegen den Bolschewismus III, Kampf um Finnland
 Europas Kampf gegen den Bolschewismus IV, Sowjetrussland; Stalin-Linie
 Europas Kampf gegen den Bolschewismus V, Aus dem Führerhauptquartier, 19. Sept. 1941
 General Rommel und die Panzerarmee Afrika
 Deutsche Schlachtschiffe brechen durch den Kanal
 Winterkrieg 1941/1942 im Osten
 Eroberung von Kertsch
 Die Schlacht bei Charkow
 Tobruk Fallt – 21. Juni 1942
 Kampf um Sewasatopol
 Einnahme Sewastopol, die stärkste Festung der Welt
 Vernichtung des Britisch-Amerikanischen Geleitzuges
 Kämpfe zwischen Donez und Don
 Sturm auf Rostow
 Luftangriffe auf Malta und Kämpfe an der El Alamein Front
 Sturm auf Armawyr und Woroschilowsky
 Dieppe 19. Aug. 1942
 Kaukasusfront (Elbrusbesteigung)
 Kampf um Stalingrad
 Von Murmansk bis Afrika
 Luftangriffe im Osten
 Heldengedenktag März 1943

III8 	FALLSCHIRMJÄGER
III10 	UNSERE STUKAS
IV7 	BOMBEN AUF ENGLAND
I8 	DEUTSCHE PANZERKREUZER
III9 	U-BOOTE
IV6 	HUSAREN DES MEERES

See also 
 Die Deutsche Wochenschau
 Nazism and cinema

German short documentary films
Films of Nazi Germany